John Borger (born  1935) is a former Canadian football player who played for the Calgary Stampeders, politician and PhD in biochemistry. John Borger played from 1956 to 1957 with the Calgary Stampeders as a Center. Borger intercepted one pass for 34 yards in his career.

In 1974 Borger contested the leadership of the Alberta Liberal Party, eventually being defeated by Nicholas Taylor.

References

Living people
1930s births
Players of Canadian football from Alberta
Canadian football offensive linemen
Calgary Stampeders players
People from the County of Grande Prairie No. 1
Candidates in the 1972 Canadian federal election
Candidates in the 1974 Canadian federal election
Candidates in the 1980 Canadian federal election